In graph theory, a graph is said to be a pseudorandom graph if it obeys certain properties that random graphs obey with high probability. There is no concrete definition of graph pseudorandomness, but there are many reasonable characterizations of pseudorandomness one can consider.

Pseudorandom properties were first formally considered by Andrew Thomason in 1987.

for every subset  of the vertex set , where  is the number of edges among  (equivalently, the number of edges in the subgraph induced by the vertex set ). It can be shown that the Erdős–Rényi random graph  is almost surely -jumbled. However, graphs with less uniformly distributed edges, for example a graph on  vertices consisting of an -vertex complete graph and  completely independent vertices, are not -jumbled for any small , making jumbledness a reasonable quantifier for "random-like" properties of a graph's edge distribution.

Connection to local conditions 

Thomason showed that the "jumbled" condition is implied by a simpler-to-check condition, only depending on the codegree of two vertices and not every subset of the vertex set of the graph. This result shows how to check the jumbledness condition algorithmically in polynomial time in the number of vertices, and can be used to show pseudorandomness of specific graphs.

Chung–Graham–Wilson theorem

In the spirit of the conditions considered by Thomason and their alternately global and local nature, several weaker conditions were considered by Chung, Graham, and Wilson in 1989: a graph  on  vertices with edge density  and some  can satisfy each of these conditions if

These conditions may all be stated in terms of a sequence of graphs  where  is on  vertices with  edges.

A sequence of graphs which satisfies those conditions is called quasi-random. It is considered particularly surprising that the weak condition of having the "correct" 4-cycle density implies the other seemingly much stronger pseudorandomness conditions. Graphs such as the 4-cycle, the density of which in a sequence of graphs is sufficient to test the quasi-randomness of the sequence, are known as forcing graphs.

In addition, the graph counting lemma, a straightforward generalization of the triangle counting lemma, implies that the discrepancy condition implies subgraph counting.

The fact that 4-cycle counting implies the codegree condition can be proven by a technique similar to the second-moment method. Firstly, the sum of codegrees can be upper-bounded:

Given 4-cycles, the sum of squares of codegrees is bounded:

 

Therefore, the Cauchy–Schwarz inequality gives

A proof that the codegree condition implies the discrepancy condition can be done by a similar, albeit trickier, computation involving the Cauchy–Schwarz inequality.

The two conditions can then be shown to be equivalent by invocation of the Courant–Fischer theorem.

Connections to graph regularity

The concept of graphs that act like random graphs connects strongly to the concept of graph regularity used in the Szemerédi regularity lemma. For , a pair of vertex sets  is called -regular, if for all subsets  satisfying , it holds that

In addition, it was shown by Miklós Simonovits and Vera T. Sós in 1991 that a graph satisfies the above weak pseudorandomness conditions used in the Chung–Graham–Wilson theorem if and only if it possesses a Szemerédi partition where nearly all densities are close to the edge density of the whole graph.

Sparse pseudorandomness

Chung–Graham–Wilson theorem analogues

The following sparse analogues of the discrepancy and eigenvalue bounding conditions are commonly considered:

It is generally true that this eigenvalue condition implies the corresponding discrepancy condition, but the reverse is not true: the disjoint union of a random large -regular graph and a -vertex complete graph has two eigenvalues of exactly  but is likely to satisfy the discrepancy property. One direction of this follows from the expander mixing lemma, while the other requires the assumption that the graph is a Cayley graph and uses the Grothendieck inequality.

Consequences of eigenvalue bounding

A -regular graph  on  vertices is called an -graph if, letting the eigenvalues of the adjacency matrix of  be , . In this sense, how much  exceeds  is a general measure of the non-randomness of a graph. They have been studied extensively and there are a number of open problems relating to their existence and commonness.

Given an  graph for small , many standard graph-theoretic quantities can be bounded to near what one would expect from a random graph. In particular, the size of  has a direct effect on subset edge density discrepancies via the expander mixing lemma. Other examples are as follows, letting  be an  graph:

 If , the vertex-connectivity  of  satisfies 
 If ,  is  edge-connected. If  is even,  contains a perfect matching.

Connections to the Green–Tao theorem

Pseudorandom graphs factor prominently in the proof of the Green–Tao theorem. The theorem is proven by transferring Szemerédi's theorem, the statement that a set of positive integers with positive natural density contains arbitrarily long arithmetic progressions, to the sparse setting (as the primes have natural density  in the integers). The transference to sparse sets requires that the sets behave pseudorandomly, in the sense that corresponding graphs and hypergraphs have the correct subgraph densities for some fixed set of small (hyper)subgraphs. It is then shown that a suitable superset of the prime numbers, called pseudoprimes, in which the primes are dense obeys these pseudorandomness conditions, completing the proof.

References

Graph theory